Thomas Ouseley "Tim" Blake Lane  (22 February 1888 – 23 November 1965) was an Australian rules footballer who played with Melbourne in the Victorian Football League (VFL).

Family
The son of Howard Ousely Blake-Lane (1846-1913), and Blanche Blake-Lane (1861-1938), née Crisp, Thomas Ouseley Blake Lane was born at Brighton Beach on 22 February 1888.

He married Lorna Victoria Penney in 1912.

Notes

References
 
 World War Two Nominal Roll: Thomas Ouseley Blake-Lane (V10698), Department of Veterans' Affairs.

External links 
 
 
 Tim Lane, at Demonwiki.

1888 births
1965 deaths
Australian rules footballers from Victoria (Australia)
Australian Rules footballers: place kick exponents
Melbourne Football Club players
Sturt Football Club players